A total solar eclipse will occur on December 6, 2067. It is a hybrid event, beginning and ending as an annular eclipse. A solar eclipse occurs when the Moon passes between Earth and the Sun, thereby totally or partly obscuring the image of the Sun for a viewer on Earth. An annular solar eclipse occurs when the Moon's apparent diameter is smaller than the Sun's, blocking most of the Sun's light and causing the Sun to look like an annulus (ring). An annular eclipse appears as a partial eclipse over a region of the Earth thousands of kilometres wide.

Related eclipses

Solar eclipses 2065–2069

Saros 143

Tritos series

Metonic series 
 All eclipses in this table occur at the Moon's ascending node.

Notes

References 

2067 12 6
2067 12 6
2067 12 6
2067 in science